Ekaterina Konstantinovna Beliaeva (born 22 June 2003) is a Russian diver.

She won a silver medal in the 10 m synchro platform competition at the 2018 European Aquatics Championships.

References

2003 births
Living people
Russian female divers
World Aquatics Championships medalists in diving